The 2018–19 ISU Grand Prix of Figure Skating was a series of invitational senior internationals which ran from October 2018 through to December 2018. Medals were awarded in the disciplines of men's singles, ladies' singles, pair skating, and ice dancing. Skaters earned points based on their placement at each event and the top six in each discipline qualified to compete at the Grand Prix Final in Vancouver.

Organized by the International Skating Union, the series set the stage for the 2019 Europeans, the 2019 Four Continents, and the 2019 World Championships. The corresponding series for junior-level skaters was the 2018–19 ISU Junior Grand Prix.

Schedule
The series comprised the following events:

Requirements 
Skaters were eligible to compete on the senior Grand Prix circuit if they had reached the age of 15 before July 1, 2018. They were also required to have earned either a minimum total score or minimum technical elements scores (TES) at certain international events.

Assignments
The ISU announced the preliminary assignments on June 29, 2018.

Men

Ladies

Pairs

Ice dancing

Changes to preliminary assignments

Skate America

Skate Canada International

Grand Prix of Helsinki

NHK Trophy

Rostelecom Cup

Internationaux de France

Medal summary

Medalists

Medal standings

Qualification 
At each event, skaters earned points toward qualification for the Grand Prix Final. Following the sixth event, the top six highest scoring skaters/teams advanced to the Final. The points earned per placement were as follows:

There were originally seven tie-breakers in cases of a tie in overall points:
	Highest placement at an event. If a skater placed 1st and 3rd, the tiebreaker is the 1st place, and that beats a skater who placed 2nd in both events.
	Highest combined total scores in both events. If a skater earned 200 points at one event and 250 at a second, that skater would win in the second tie-break over a skater who earned 200 points at one event and 150 at another.
	Participated in two events.
	Highest combined scores in the free skating/free dancing portion of both events.
	Highest individual score in the free skating/free dancing portion from one event.
	Highest combined scores in the short program/short dance of both events.
	Highest number of total participants at the events.

If a tie remained, it was considered unbreakable and the tied skaters all advanced to the Grand Prix Final.

Qualification standings
Bold denotes Grand Prix Final qualification.

Qualifiers

Top Grand Prix scores

Men

Best total score

Best short program score

Best free skating score

Ladies

Best total score

Best short program score

Best free skating score

Pairs

Best total score

Best short program score

Best free skating score

Ice dancing

Best total score

Best rhythm dance score

Best free dance score

References

External links 
 ISU Grand Prix of Figure Skating at the International Skating Union

Isu Grand Prix Of Figure Skating, 2018-19
ISU Grand Prix of Figure Skating